The locomotives of the Glasgow and South Western Railway (G&SWR). The G&SWR had its headquarters in Glasgow with its main locomotive works in Kilmarnock.

Engines inherited from constituent companies 
The G&SWR was formed in 1850 from a merger of the Glasgow, Paisley, Kilmarnock and Ayr Railway (GPK&AR) and the Glasgow, Dumfries and Carlisle Railway (GD&CR). A number of other companies were absorbed by the G&SWR or its predecessors, including the Ardrossan Railway, the Paisley and Renfrew Railway and the Kilmarnock and Troon Railway.

Engines built by the Glasgow and South Western Railway 
One notable feature of the G&SWR’s locomotive stock was its aversion to tank engines. Until very late on in the company’s history these were used only when circumstances absolutely demanded it.

Patrick Stirling (1853-1866) 
See Patrick Stirling

James Stirling (1866-1878) 
See James Stirling

Hugh Smellie (1878-1890) 
See Hugh Smellie

James Manson (1890-1911) 
See James Manson

Peter Drummond (1911-1918) 
See Peter Drummond

R. H. Whitelegg (1918-1922) 
See Robert Harben Whitelegg

Numbering and classification 
The very first engines of the GPK&AR were named but soon after received numbers. As the GD&CR was always intended to merge with the former its engines were allocated numbers following on from the GPK&AR sequence.

From 1851 new engines were given the numbers of older engines that had been withdrawn from service. Eventually new engines were being allocated the numbers of old engines that were intended for withdrawal but which were still running and so two engines would be running with the same number. In 1878 Hugh Smellie introduced an ‘R’ list to cater for older engines whose number had been allocated to a newer one. Later on Manson used an ‘A’ list system, where the older engine had an ‘A’ added to its number. By 1919 the system was so complicated that there was a complete renumbering of all engines.

Class numbers were the number of the first engine built in the class. Given the policy on numbering this meant that classes with lower numbers could frequently be newer than higher numbered classes.

See also LMS locomotive numbering and classification

Liveries 
Various shades of green provided the basic colour of the locomotives, with lining in black and white or black and yellow.

Locomotives under LMS ownership 

The G&SWR locomotive stock fell foul of the London, Midland and Scottish Railway policy of standardisation following the grouping. Within ten years nearly 80% had been withdrawn from service and only a single 1 Class 0-6-2T engine remained by nationalisation in 1948.

Preservation 

Only one G&SWR locomotive has survived:

 Glasgow and South Western Railway 5 Class 0-6-0T no. 9. In 1919 this became class 322, no. 324 and in the LMS was no. 16379.

Sold by the LMS in 1934 to a colliery in Denbighshire, and subsequently passing into National Coal Board ownership, it was from that location that it was acquired for preservation.  It is now on display in the Glasgow Museum of Transport.

Notes

Sources
 Highet, Campbell (1965) The Glasgow & South-Western Railway, Lingfield: Oakwood Press
 Smith, David L. (1976) Locomotives of the Glasgow and South Western Railway, Newton Abbot: David & Charles
 
 Baxter, Bertram (1984) British Locomotive Catalogue 1825-1923 Volume 4 Scottish and remaining English Companies in the LMS Group, Ashbourne: Moorland Publishing

External links 
 The Glasgow & South Western Railway Association

British railway-related lists
 
Glasgow and South Western Railway